"Passing Strangers" is Ultravox's second single from Vienna, the band's first album with Midge Ure, released on Chrysalis Records on 15 October 1980.

A fast-paced guitar track recalling early John Foxx-era Ultravox, Passing Strangers ultimately failed to live up to the top 30 success of its predecessor Sleepwalk. It stalled at #57 in the UK charts despite having a music video (directed by Russell Mulcahy and featuring Barbie Wilde and Tok from Tik & Tok) and release on 12" format alongside the regular 7", both of which Sleepwalk lacked.

The single contains two live b-sides; "Face To Face", an original Ultravox track that was never recorded in studio, and a live cover of the Brian Eno song "King's Lead Hat". "Face to Face" was taken from a show in St Albans City Hall. The complete show was released on the 40th anniversary Vienna box-set 2020.

Track listing

7" version 
 "Passing Strangers" – 3:48
 "Face to Face (Live 16 Aug 80 at St Albans City Hall)" – 6:04

12" version
 "Passing Strangers" – 3:48
 "Face to Face (Live 16 Aug 80 at St Albans City Hall)" – 6:04
 "King's Lead Hat (Live 17 Aug 80 at Lyceum)" – 4:06

References

1980 singles
Electronic songs
Ultravox songs
Songs written by Midge Ure
Songs written by Warren Cann
Songs written by Chris Cross
Songs written by Billy Currie
1980 songs
Chrysalis Records singles